Scleromochlus (from  , 'hard' and  , 'lever') is an extinct genus of small pterosauromorph archosaurs from the Late Triassic period. The genus contains the type and only species Scleromochlus taylori, named by Arthur Smith Woodward in 1907.

Discovery
 
Its fossils have been found in the Carnian Lossiemouth Sandstone of Scotland. The holotype was discovered around 1900 and is listed as specimen BMNH R3556, a partial skeleton preserved as an impression in sandstone, with portions of the skull and tail missing.

Description
Studies about its gait suggest that it engaged in kangaroo- or springhare-like plantigrade hopping; however, a 2020 reassessment of Scleromochlus by Bennett suggested that it was a "sprawling quadrupedal hopper analogous to frogs." If Scleromochlus is indeed related to pterosaurs, this may offer insight as to how the latter evolved, since early pterosaurs also show adaptations for saltatorial locomotion.

Classification
 

A lightly built cursorial animal, its phylogenetic position has been debated; as different analyses have found it to be either the basal-most ornithodiran, the sister-taxon to Pterosauria, or a basal member of Avemetatarsalia that lies outside of Ornithodira. In the phylogenetic analyses conducted by Nesbitt et al. (2017) Scleromochlus was recovered either as a basal member of Dinosauromorpha or as a non-aphanosaurian, non-pterosaur basal avemetatarsalian. However, the authors stressed that scoring Scleromochlus was challenging given the small size and poor preservation of the fossils, and stated that it could not be scored for many of the important characters that optimize near the base of Avemetatarsalia.

In 2020, Bennett interpreted Scleromochlus as possessing certain characteristics, including osteoderms and a crurotarsal morphology of the ankle, which suggested that Scleromochlus was not closely related to ornithodirans. Instead, he argued for a position of Scleromochlus among the Doswelliidae or elsewhere among basal members of the Archosauriformes.

However, in 2022, Foffa and colleagues reconstructed a complete skeleton using microcomputed tomographic scans of the 7 specimens found to date. This enabled a new phylogenetic analysis to be undertaken, which strongly supported the hypothesis that Scleromochlus was a member of the Pterosauromorpha – either as a genus of the Lagerpetidae family (shown to be a part of Pterosauromorpha in 2020) or as the sister group to pterosaurs and lagerpetids. Previous alternative classifications were demonstrated to have been based on misinterpretations of incomplete or ambiguous anatomical features found in the fossil record.

References 

Pterosauromorpha
Triassic archosaurs
Carnian genera
Late Triassic reptiles of Europe
Triassic Scotland
Fossils of Scotland
Fossil taxa described in 1907
Taxa named by Arthur Smith Woodward
Prehistoric reptile genera